Sombrero Butte is a populated place situated in Pinal County, Arizona, United States. The location takes its name from a nearby butte of the same name, so called because of its resemblance to a huge sombrero.

References

Populated places in Pinal County, Arizona